Willow is a census-designated place (CDP) in the Matanuska-Susitna Borough in the U.S. state of Alaska. Located 26 miles northwest from Wasilla along the George Parks Highway, it is part of the Anchorage, Alaska Metropolitan Statistical Area. At the 2020 census the population was 2,196, up from 2,102 in 2010.

History
The community got its start in 1897 when miners discovered gold on Willow Creek. Ships and boats brought supplies and equipment up Cook Inlet, landing at Knik or Tyonek. From Knik, a 26-mile summer trail went northwesterly. The trail along Willow Creek heading east became Hatcher Pass Road, currently an adventurous scenic road used during the summer tour season.

In 1920, the Alaska Railroad built its Willow station house at mile 185.7 along the tracks leading from Seward to Fairbanks.

During World War II, a radar warning station and airfield were built near the railroad tracks; a post office was established in 1948.
  
By 1954, Willow Creek was Alaska's largest gold mining district, with a total production approaching 18 million dollars.
   
Around 1970, before construction of the Parks Highway, Willow had a population of 78 until land disposals, homestead subdivisions, and completion of the George Parks Highway in 1972 fueled growth in the area.
   
In 1976, Alaskans elected to move the state capital from Juneau to Willow in an effort to improve access for Alaskans while keeping the capital out of Anchorage, the largest city. Landscape architect M. Paul Friedberg created a master plan for the city as part of one such proposal. This fueled interest and land speculation in the area. However, funding to enable the capital move was defeated in the November 1982 election. As a result, Juneau remains the state capital.
   
More than half of the 1,500 cabins around Willow are for seasonal use. Nearly all of the occupied homes in Willow are fully plumbed, using individual on-site water wells, septic tanks and drain fields.

Willow is now the official host of the Iditarod Trail Sled Dog Race restart.

In June 2015, a large wildfire burned thousands of acres of wilderness, numerous structures and forced the closure of the George Parks Highway, severing the road link between Anchorage and Fairbanks.

Geography
Willow is located at  (61.769345, -149.991065).

By area, it is the largest CDP in the United States.

Climate
Willow has a subarctic climate with long and cold winters and mild summers.

Demographics

Willow first appeared on the 1940 U.S. Census as the unincorporated village of "Willow Station." It next appeared in 1960 and in every successive census as Willow. It was made a census-designated place (CDP) in 1980.

2020 census

At the 2020 census, there were 2,196 people, 717 households, and 431 families in the CDP. The population density was 3.18 people per square mile (1.23/km2), with 2,228 housing units at an average density of 3.23 per square mile (1.25/km2).

2010 census
At the 2010 census, there were 2,102 people, 893 households, and 572 families residing in the CDP. The population density was 3.0 people per square mile (1.16/km2), with 1,912 housing units at an average density of 2.8 per square mile (1.08/km2). The racial makeup was 1,908 (90.77%) White, 109 (5.19%) Native American, 17 (0.81%) Asian, 2 (0.1%) Pacific Islander, 6 (0.29%) from other races, and 60 (2.85%) from two or more races. 27 (1.28%) of the population were Hispanic or Latino.

There were 893 households, of which 212 (23.74%) had children under the age of 18 living with them, 487 (54.54%) were married opposite-sex couples living together, 38 (4.26%) had a female householder with no husband present, 62 (6.94%) were unmarried opposite-sex couples, 4 (0.45%) were unmarried same-sex couples, and 321 (35.95%) were non-families. 257 (28.78%) of all households were made up of individuals, and 78 (8.73%) had someone living alone who was 65 years of age or older. The average household size was 2.34, and the average family size was 2.86.

The population was spread out, with 439 (20.9%) under the age of 18, 126 (6.0%) aged 18 to 24, 442 (21.03%) aged 25 to 44, 786 (37.39%) aged 45 to 64, and 309 (14.7%) who were 65 years of age or older. The median age was 46.4 years. For every 100 females, there were 114.5 males.

2000 census
As of the census of 2000, there were 1,658 people, 654 households, and 438 families residing in the CDP.  The population density was 2.4 people per square mile (0.9/km2).  There were 1,530 housing units at an average density of 2.2 per square mile (0.9/km2).  The racial makeup of the CDP was 92.40% White, 3.08% Native American, 0.24% Asian, 0.42% from other races, and 3.86% from two or more races.  1.27% of the population were Hispanic or Latino of any race.

There were 654 households, out of which 32.0% had children under the age of 18 living with them, 56.6% were married couples living together, 5.5% had a female householder with no husband present, and 33.0% were non-families. 25.8% of all households were made up of individuals, and 4.9% had someone living alone who was 65 years of age or older.  The average household size was 2.54 and the average family size was 3.08.

In the CDP, the population was spread out, with 27.9% under the age of 18, 5.4% from 18 to 24, 27.9% from 25 to 44, 29.2% from 45 to 64, and 9.6% who were 65 years of age or older.  The median age was 40 years. For every 100 females, there were 114.2 males. Of residents age 18 and over, there were 119.3 males for every 100 females.

The median income for a household in the CDP was $38,906, and the median income for a family was $41,944. Males had a median income of $42,188 versus $29,792 for females. The per capita income for the CDP was $22,323.  About 15.3% of families and 22.1% of the population were below the poverty line, including 38.1% of those under age 18 and 4.6% of those age 65 or over.

State Parks
A few miles north of Willow is the Alaska State Parks Willow Creek State Recreation Area, a  park which features a large campground and access to one of the busiest salmon fishing areas in the state.
Other area parks include Nancy Lake State Recreation Area and the Montana Creek State Recreation Site, an  park with a campground.
One end of the road to Hatcher Pass is in Willow. Willow lake has great Char fishing and a library on its shoreline.

Notable people
Due to its outlying location and access to trails, Willow has become a popular destination for a number of notable dog mushers.  Iditarod Trail Sled Dog Race competitors DeeDee Jonrowe, Beverly Masek and Iditarod winner Dallas Seavey have established their residence and dog kennels in Willow.  Masek also represented Willow and the surrounding area in the Alaska House of Representatives from 1995 to 2005.
John Gourley, lead singer and guitarist of Grammy Award-winning American rock band "Portugal. The Man" was born in Willow, Alaska.

References

Anchorage metropolitan area
Census-designated places in Alaska
Census-designated places in Matanuska-Susitna Borough, Alaska
Mining communities in Alaska
Populated places established in 1897